Jan Torbjörn Eriksson (born 17 April 1971 in Grycksbo) is a retired Swedish athlete who competed in the sprinting events. He is best known for winning the bronze medal in the 200 metres at the 1996 European Indoor Championships in his native Sweden. In addition, he competed at the 1992 and 1996 Summer Olympics, as well as four consecutive World Championships, starting in 1993.

In 2008, he started coaching Swedish hurdlers, sisters Jenny and Susanna Kallur.

Competition record

Personal bests
Outdoor
100 metres – 10.30 (Gävle 1996)
200 metres – 20.58 (-0.6 m/s) (Seville 1999)
Indoor
60 metres – 6.75 (Malmö 1998)
200 metres – 21.02 (Ghent 1996)

References

All-Athletics profile

1971 births
Living people
Swedish male sprinters
People from Falun Municipality
Olympic athletes of Sweden
Athletes (track and field) at the 1992 Summer Olympics
Athletes (track and field) at the 1996 Summer Olympics
World Athletics Championships athletes for Sweden
Sportspeople from Dalarna County
20th-century Swedish people